Samalizumab is a humanized monoclonal antibody designed for oncology indications.

Samalizumab was developed by Alexion Pharmaceuticals.

References 

Monoclonal antibodies